This was the first edition of the tournament.

Valeria Savinykh won the title after defeating Ayla Aksu 3–6, 7–6(12–10), 7–6(7–5) in the final.

Seeds

Draw

Finals

Top half

Bottom half

References
Main Draw

Mençuna Cup - Singles
Mençuna Cup